CODEM may refer to:

 Convergence for Development, a political party in Macau.
 Convergence pour le développement du Mali, a political party in Mali.
 Colorado Democratic Party, a branch of the Democratic Party of the United States